Paupack is an unincorporated community in Pike County, Pennsylvania, United States. Paupack has a post office with ZIP code 18451, which opened on October 19, 1900.

The community derives its name from Wallenpaupack Creek.

The area was originally served by the Paupack School which dates back to 1925 and is on the National Register of Historic Places.

References

Unincorporated communities in Pike County, Pennsylvania
Unincorporated communities in Pennsylvania